Piedmont Wagon Company was a horse-drawn wagon works company in Hickory, Catawba County, North Carolina. Founded by George G. Bonniwell and A. L. (Andy) Ramseur in 1878, it became "one of the most conspicuous examples of New South prosperity in North Carolina" during the late 19th and early 20th centuries. One of the company's remaining buildings, constructed in 1889, is a 2 1/2-story "L"-shaped brick structure listed on the National Register of Historic Places in 1985. In 2015, the building was restored and repurposed as office space.

References

Hickory, North Carolina
Industrial buildings and structures on the National Register of Historic Places in North Carolina
Industrial buildings completed in 1889
Buildings and structures in Catawba County, North Carolina
National Register of Historic Places in Catawba County, North Carolina